"Scream Again" is the season premiere and the fourteenth episode of the horror black comedy series Scream Queens, which premiered on Fox on September 20, 2016. It was directed by Brad Falchuk and written by Falchuk and his co-creators, Ryan Murphy and Ian Brennan. The episode was watched by 2.17 million viewers and received mixed to positive reviews from critics.

The episode revolves around Cathy Munsch's recent acquisition, the C.U.R.E. Hospital, which she bought in order to cure the incurable and to reorganize the U.S. health system, while flashbacks shows a connection with the hospital from 1985. Zayday Williams and the Chanels are cast as medical students by Cathy, while a new serial killer surfaces.

Plot

1985 
On October 31, 1985, a pregnant woman named Jane (Trilby Glover) arrives at hospital Our Lady of Perpetual Suffering during a Halloween party, saying her husband, Bill (Jeremy Batiste), has COPD and needs medical assistance immediately. Nurse Thomas (Laura Bell Bundy) and Dr. Mike (Jerry O'Connell) determine that Bill's surgery will succeed at morning, an excuse to return to the party. However, he agrees to do the operation after Jane threatens to have his medical license revoked and the hospital shut down. Then, Dr. Mike injects the woman's husband with an anesthetic and decides to dump his body in a swamp. Nurse Thomas seems hesitant about that and explains to Dr. Mike that she grew up in the area and heard some stories about a monster that lives by the swamp, the Green Meanie. Dr. Mike explains to her that the swamp's the real monster and dumps the body and his costume in the swamp, while Jane is in the waiting room, unaware of what happened.

Early 2016 
Cathy Munsch (Jamie Lee Curtis), now recognized by her movement known as New New Feminism and as a global icon, explains to an audience she's into a new social cause: reforming America's health care system. She opened the C.U.R.E. Institute using her own personal publishing fortune, with the intent of hiring only the best doctors to solve the world's most incurable medical cases. It is then revealed that Hester (Lea Michele) confessed her crimes, which lead to the Chanels to be acquitted. An award-winning Netflix documentary series turned them into a national obsession. Although innocent, the Chanels are despised by the public. To improve their public images, the three graduate in Communications, which they later realized were useless. Chanel #5 (Abigail Breslin) got a job as a receptionist; Chanel #3 (Billie Lourd) got a job mopping floors at a sperm bank; and Chanel Oberlin (Emma Roberts) started to work as a phlebotomist. Nevertheless, their lives continued to be miserable.

Later, Cathy visits Zayday Williams (Keke Palmer) at the restaurant where she works, where Zayday tells that she managed to graduate from Wallace University in only two years and is now working on three jobs to pay her medical school. Cathy then offers to pay for Zayday's medical study, if she agrees to work at C.U.R.E Institute.

October 2016 
Dr. Brock Holt (John Stamos) and Dr. Cassidy Cascade (Taylor Lautner) introduce themselves to their first patient, Catherine Hobart (Cecily Strong), and diagnose her with hypertrichosis, otherwise known as werewolf syndrome. Also, Cathy and Zayday reintroduce themselves to each other. Later, Dr. Cassidy states he became a doctor after seeing the terrible medical care his family has gotten throughout the years, while Dr. Brock explains how Cathy hired him after seeing his spread in a magazine. Zayday questions Brock about the scar on his wrist, and he reveals he's the recipient of the world's first hand transplant. He explains that he lost his hand in a sink drain during a blackout. However, after he received his new hand, he couldn't get a job, and that's why he is so thankful for Cathy giving him a second chance. Brock leaves, and Zayday touches Cassidy's back and says he feels like ice, and after he leaves, she seems freaked out about her co-workers.

Doctors say there's nothing to do with Catherine while Zayday says they can work harder. Chamberlain Jackson (James Earl), the hospital's candy stripper, arrives to cheer Catherine up, but instead he upsets her by calling her "Hairy Mary." Catherine considers leaving the hospital, but Zayday convinces her to stay a more week. Zayday then goes to Cathy's office to discuss the possibility of hiring more ladies, to which Cathy responds that she has an idea. Cathy drives in a limo to the Chanel's current residence, and offers them a job at the hospital, to which they agree. Later, the Chanels meet with Zayday, who says she's happy having the Chanels back, and are introduced to the hospital's system and to a half-naked Dr. Brock. Zayday explains to Catherine that she had done some research, and presents her a cure for Catherine's disease. The Chanels interrupt and start saying rude things to Catherine, and Brock apologize on their behalf. Zayday explains the procedure, and Catherine gets scared of getting a lobotomy, but Zayday and Brock assure that there's no other options, and Catherine agrees. As the Chanels leave the room, Chanel affirms that they're doctors and the nurses are their servant, and they are reprimanded by Ingrid Marie Hoffel (Kirstie Alley). She introduces herself as an Advanced Practice Registered Nurse, the head of C.U.R.E.'s administration. Ingrid demonstrates her displeasure at them, and she says that they are disqualified to the medical ward, stating that Cathy called them to kill them, and they don't belong to the hospital.

Cathy scolds the Chanels for their behavior in front of Catherine. Chanel decides she will help find a cure for Catherine in order to get Cathy to look her with new eyes. Chanel visits Brock, and he discovers that Catherine's diet based on Vitamin C was increasing the level of testosterone in her body. The two rush into the operating room in time to stop the lobotomy, and Brock recommends putting Catherine under a new soy-based diet. The next morning, the Chanel discover that Catherine lost every inch of hair on her body. Catherine gets annoyed with the situation, and the Chanels decide to make a full blown makeover to cheer her up. After, Catherine is happy with the result and Cathy congratulates the Chanels for their work. Chanel and #3 reveals they have dates with Brock and Cassidy to #5, who is upset she still has to work in the graveyard shift. #5 brings Catherine to the basement for a hydrotherapy bath, and #5 locks Catherine and herself in the tubs, since the tubs are equipped with a self-locking mechanism. The Green Meanie appears in the basement and attacks the girls, decapitating Catherine with a machete.

Production 
"Scream Again" was directed by series' co-creator Brad Falchuk and written by Falchuk alongside also co-creators Ryan Murphy and Ian Brennan. On January 15, 2016, Fox renewed the series for a second season, to be set in a hospital. In June 2016, John Stamos, Taylor Lautner and James Earl joined the cast of the series, portraying doctors and an employee at the hospital, respectively. In July, Jerry O'Connell and Laura Bell Bundy were announced to have recurring roles as Dr. Mike and Nurse Thomas, respectively. In September 2016, Kirstie Alley was cast in the series, playing Ingrid Hoffel.

Reception

Ratings 
"Scream Again" premiered in the U.S. on September 20, 2016, on Fox, to a viewership of 2.17 million viewers, and received a 1.0 rating in the 18–49 demographic, according to Nielsen Media Research.

Critical response 
Terri Schwartz of IGN wrote a mixed review for the episode, stating: "Scream Queens goes off the deep end with no life preserver in sight for Season 2, losing any tenuous grips on reality for the sake of turning its central characters into even bigger caricatures than they were in Season 1. While some of the stalwarts work -- particularly Curtis' Munsch and Roberts' Chanel #1 -- the show still has a way to go before it fully finds its voice." TVFanatic writer Caralynn Lippo affirmed "[the episode] was a fun start to the new season. It managed to successfully reintroduce all of our favorite characters after a two year time jump, while still laying the groundwork for what seems like a fun new setting and killer mystery."

References

External links 
 

2016 American television episodes
Fiction set in 2016
Scream Queens (2015 TV series) episodes
Television episodes written by Ryan Murphy (writer)
Television episodes written by Brad Falchuk